The Dreamhoppers is an American comic book series illustrated and written by Travis Moore who also illustrated DC Comics' Freedom Fighters, Justice Society of America, Wonder Woman, Titan, The Green Team, Sword of Sorcery. The Dreamhoppers were a group of fictional superhero characters that appeared in comic books published by Laizen Comics.

Main story
Evolving from their harmonious fascination with the synchronicity between the dream world, real world and the Universe, Dreamhoppers is an action adventure about the supernatural powers given to certain people known as Dreamhoppers. These guardians of the Dreamworld can transform their human forms into fantasy characters and enter dreams in order to save one from the evils in the Dreamworld.

Development
In 2008, Shin Koyamada and Nia Lyte teamed up with graphic comic artist Travis Moore who later worked DC Comics projects Superman, Wonder woman and Freedom Fighter to begin fleshing out the story and characters for the Dreamhoppers.

Distribution
The Dreamhoppers was distributed by independent comic stores in three US States, including Meltdown Comics, House of Secrets, Flipside Comics, Comickaze Comics Books, Galactic Comics, On Comic Ground, Rising Sun Creations, San Diego Comics & Collectibles, Southern California Comics, Comix Experience in California; Alternate Reality Comics, Comic Oasis, Wishing Well Comics, Avatar Comics and Games in Nevada; as well as St. Mark's Comics in New York City.

See also
American comics
American comics creators
Comics publishing companies

References

External links
Laizen Comics official site
The Dreamhoopers official site

The Dreamhoppers at My Comic Shop

2009 comics debuts
Superhero comics
United States-themed superheroes
Fantasy comics